Ohto Heikki Sulevi Manninen (24 March 1943 in Helsinki), is a Finnish historian, PhD 1977. Manninen was 1984–95 associate professor at Helsinki University, 1995–98 professor of Finland's history at Tampere University. In 1998 he became professor in the history of war at the academy of military science.

Ohto Manninen has focused foremost on second world war history, and this has resulted in books like Toteutumaton valtioliitto (1977), which treats Finland and Sweden after the Winter war, Suur-Suomen ääriviivat (1980), which is about Finland's politics on Germany 1941, and Talvisodan salatut taustat (1994), a survey on the Soviet plans of operations before the Winter war, and collections of articles Molotovin cocktail – Hitlerin sateenvarjo (1994) and Stalinin kiusa – Himmlerin täi (2002).

References 
 Uppslagsverket Finland, 3 (2005)

Publications
 
 
 

20th-century Finnish historians
1943 births
Living people
21st-century Finnish historians
Academic staff of Tampere University